Fellows of the Royal Society elected in 1975.

Fellows

Arthur Erdélyi  (1908–1977)
Peter Christopher Caldwell  (1927–1979)
Sir John Charnley  (1911–1982)
Richard Weck  (1913–1986)
James Munro Dodd  (1915–1986)
Patrick Alfred Pierce Moran  (1917–1988)
Denis Arthur Haydon  (1930–1988)
Geoffrey Morse Binnie  (1908–1989)
Reginald Charles Rainey  (1913–1990)
Edward George Bowen  (1911–1991)
Keith Dalziel  (1921–1994)
Paul Jose de Mayo  (1924–1994)
Sir Barry Albert Cross  (1925–1994)
Raymond John Heaphy Beverton  (1922–1995)
Sir George Malcolm Brown  (1925–1997)
John Wyrill Christian  (1926–2001)
Cesar Milstein  (1927–2002)
Sir Robert Wilson  (1927–2002)
 Sir Godfrey Newbold Hounsfield  (1919–2004)
George P. L. Walker  (1926–2005)
Dame Anne McLaren  (1927–2007)
Stanley Hay Umphray Bowie  (1917–2008)
Andrew R. Lang  (1924–2008)
Boris P. Stoicheff  (1924–2010)
Anthony Milner Lane  (d. 2011)
Ralph Owen Slatyer  (1929–2012)
A. David Buckingham
Sir Ronald Mason
Edward Charles Slater
Sir David Cecil Smith
Frederick Whatley
Sir Christopher Zeeman

Foreign members

Henry Gilman  (1893–1986)
Michael Heidelberger  (1888–1991)
Feodor Lynen  (1911–1979)
Lars Onsager  (1903–1976)

References

1975
1975 in science
1975 in the United Kingdom